SIRT can refer to :

 Selective internal radiation therapy for cancer
 Serious Incident Response Team, Nova Scotia, Canada
 Sirtuin, a class of proteins (enzymes) related to genetics
 Staten Island Railway (from abbreviation Staten Island Rapid Transit)

See also
 Siirt, a city in Turkey 
 Sirt, another name for Sirte, a city in Libya
 Sirte (disambiguation)